The Battle of Imbrinium was fought in 325 BC during the Second Samnite War between the Roman Republic, led by the magister equitum, Quintus Fabius Maximus Rullianus (acting without the permission of the dictator Lucius Papirius Cursor) and the Samnites near Imbrinium, a city in Samnium.

Background 
In 325 BC, Lucius Papirius Cursor, a distinguished soldier, was appointed dictator for the purpose of continuing the war against the Samnites after the consul Lucius Furius Camillus fell ill that same year.  Quintus Fabius Maximus Rullianus was appointed as his magister equitum.  The other consul for that year, Decimus Junius Brutus Scaeva, was preoccupied with a campaign against the Vestini.After consulting with keeper of the sacred chickens, Cursor decided to leave for Rome in order take the auspices before battle, ordering Rullianus to maintain the army's position while he was gone.  After reports from his scouts claiming that the Samnites were unprepared for battle, Rullianus decided to go against his orders and engage the enemy.

Battle 
Rullianus engaged the Samnites near the town of Imbrinium.  After many unsuccessful attempts by the cavalry to break the enemy lines, Lucius Cominius, a military tribune, suggested that the cavalrymen remove the bridles from their horses and charge quickly towards the enemy lines.  This strategy worked, and the Samnites were thrown into disorder.  The Roman infantry advanced on the enemy and routed the entire force, slaying nearly 20,000 men that day alone.

Aftermath 
Rullianus's army took many spoils from the battle, but the magister equitum ordered that all of the enemy's arms be burned, likely out of spite for Cursor, who he feared would attempt to take credit for the victory.  Rullianus sent a dispatch to the senate, and Cursor was infuriated by the news, claiming that Rullianus had disrespected the traditional office of dictator.

References 

Imbrinium
Imbrinium
325 BC
Imbrinium
4th century BC in the Roman Republic